San Bernardino Pass is a high mountain pass in the Swiss Alps connecting the Hinterrhein and the Mesolcina (Misox) valleys between Thusis (canton of Graubünden) and Bellinzona (canton of Ticino). Located in the far eastern side of the Western Alps it is not to be confused with the Great St Bernard Pass and the Little St Bernard Pass. The top of the pass represents both the Italo-German language frontier and the watershed (drainage divide) between the Po basin and the Rhine basin.

The route first became important as a mule track in the fifteenth century when the route between Thusis and Splügen was known as the Via Mala. A road for wheeled vehicles was opened in 1770; this road was significantly improved between 1821 and 1823, financed in part by the Kingdom of Sardinia, keen to improve a trade route connecting Genoa and Piedmont to the Graubünden that was not directly controlled by Austria.

Traffic flow was much facilitated when in 1967, the San Bernardino road tunnel was completed: since then vehicle traffic on the pass has been reduced, benefiting those taking the time to avoid the tunnel. The pass road is only open from May to November.

Climate

See also
 List of highest paved roads in Europe
 List of mountain passes
List of the highest Swiss passes

Bibliography
 Nicola Pfund, Sui passi in bicicletta - Swiss Alpine passes by bicycle, Fontana Edizioni, 2012, p. 134-139.

References

External links 
Profile on climbbybike.com

Bernardino, Pass San
Bernardino, Pass San
Mountain passes of Graubünden
Roads in Switzerland
Lepontine Alps
Rheinwald